William Roby Fletcher (6 April 1833 – 5 June 1894), 
commonly known as Roby Fletcher or W. Roby Fletcher, was a Congregational minister and vice-chancellor of the University of Adelaide.

Fletcher was born in Manchester, England.  He was the son of the Rev. Richard Fletcher, a well-known Congregational minister who ministered in Manchester and later in Melbourne, Victoria, where he died in 1861. Fletcher was educated at Silcoats School in Yorkshire, the University of Bonn, the Lancashire Independent College and Owens College (now Victoria University), Manchester. He graduated with a Bachelor of Arts degree from London University in 1853 and in the following year received the London University prize for the scripture examination. In 1856 he graduated Master of Arts and won the gold medal. He soon sailed for Sydney and ultimately went to Victoria where he acted as his father's assistant in St Kilda and Sandhurst (now Bendigo). In 1866 he removed to the Richmond suburb of Melbourne and was appointed a professor at the Congregational College of Victoria.

After a tour around the world he became the minister of Stow Memorial Church in Adelaide in March 1876, and filled that position with marked success until 1890, when he resigned to undertake further travel. From 1878 he was a member of the council of the University of Adelaide, of which he was made an honorary M.A. in 1877. During the last illness, and subsequent to the death of the late Professor Davidson, he was the acting Hughes Professor of English Language and Literature and Mental and Moral Philosophy. In 1890 he was elected vice-chancellor of the university.

References

1833 births
1894 deaths
Clergy from Manchester
People educated at Silcoates School
University of Bonn alumni
Alumni of the Victoria University of Manchester
English emigrants to Australia
Australian Congregationalist ministers
Academic staff of the University of Adelaide
Vice-Chancellors of the University of Adelaide